Kroya Station (KYA) is a railway station located in Bajing, Kroya, Cilacap Regency, Central Java, Indonesia. The station has nine railway tracks. It is a major junction station where the line from Yogyakarta split, where one goes to Purwokerto and Cirebon, while other head to Bandung.

History

Kroya Station is estimated to have existed since the construction of the Cilacap-Kroya-Kutoarjo-Yogyakarta railway line on 20 July 1887. The development also included a branch line to Purworejo which opened on the same date.

Initially this station consisted only of a main building and a platform that had a canopy that was almost similar to Manggarai Station (see picture). With the increase in the volume of passenger transportation at this station, the station building was later enlarged until it was finally replaced by overcapping in the 1990s. This old canopy, similar to Manggarai Station, appeared in the film .

Services
The following is a list of train services at the Kroya Station.

Passenger services
 Executive class
 Mixed class
 Joglosemarkerto, looping train Central Java and Special Region of Yogyakarta (executive-economy) with destination of:
 
 
 Economy class
 Serayu, destination of  via  and 

Freight services
 Over Night Services, destination of  via -- and  via

References

External links
 
  
  
  

Cilacap Regency
Railway stations in Central Java
Railway stations opened in 1887